Stenogobius polyzona, the Chinestripe goby, is a species of goby native to streams and rivers on Madagascar and Réunion.  Males of this species can reach a length of  SL while females can reach  SL.

References

Chinestripe goby
Freshwater fish of Madagascar
Taxonomy articles created by Polbot
Taxa named by Pieter Bleeker
Fish described in 1867